Deshamanya Dr Vernon Loraine Benjamin Mendis (5 December 1925 – 23 June 2010) was a prominent Sri Lankan diplomat, who served as the United Nations' Special Envoy to the Middle East. He is referred to as the Sri Lanka's Father of Diplomacy due to his role in formation of the country's diplomatic service and has served as Sri Lankan High Commissioner to the United Kingdom, Canada; Ambassador to France, Cuba and Secretary General of the Non Aligned Movement.

Education
Dr Vernon Mendis was educated at Prince of Wales' College, Moratuwa. and the Royal College Colombo. He then pursued further studies at the University of Ceylon, where he studied history gaining a Bachelor of Arts (Second Upper Honours in History). His classmate at Royal College Colombo was Hon. Justice Christopher Weeramantry who became the Vice-President of the International Court of Justice. He would later gain a Master of Philosophy from School of Oriental and African Studies of the University of London.

Diplomatic career

Dr Mendis was in the first batch of cadets who were taken into the newly formed Ceylon Overseas Service in 1949 through a highly competitive examination and selection process and later given permanent appointment by Prime Minister D. S. Senanayake. His first placement was as counselor in Ceylon's embassy in Washington, D.C., where Sir Claude Corea was ambassador. After Washington he was sent to Tokyo to the newly established mission there before its first ambassador, Sir Susantha de Fonseka arrived. He then served in Ceylon's missions in Paris as Chargé d'affaires (1953–1955) and Moscow (1955–1960) where Dr.G.P. Malalasekera was the ambassador. He was recalled to Ceylon in 1960 to be appointed as Chief of Protocol in the Ministry of Defense and External Affairs at the age of 35, one of the youngest to hold that position. Next he was made deputy high commissioner for Ceylon in London and later in New Delhi.

In 1965 he was appointed as High Commissioner to the United Kingdom. In 1970 he was recalled to Colombo, where he was Foreign Affairs Advisor to the Prime Minister Sirimavo Bandaranaike, during which time he played a major role in the formulation of foreign policy of Sri Lanka which had become a republic in 1972. A major milestone of his career was in 1976 when he functioned as the Secretary General of the Non Aligned Movement Summit in Colombo, where he had to chair sessions in the presence of some of the greatest leaders at the time, such as Indian Prime Minister Indira Gandhi, Yugoslavian Premier Marshal Josip Broz Tito, Cuban President Fidel Castro. Soon after he was appointed the high commissioner of Sri Lanka to Canada with concurrent accreditation to Cuba. When his tenure as high commissioner ended in 1980 he retired from the Sri Lanka Overseas Service.

United Nation Special Envoy to the Middle East
Soon after leaving the foreign Service he took up a posting with the United Nations as Special Envoy in the Middle East based in Cairo, serving as the Regional Director of UNESCO. There he was in charge of looking after the interests of the United Nations in the Gulf where Egypt was making waves in its foreign policy. He had to deal with some of the issues in relation to Egypt's Cultural Treasures on behalf of the UNESCO and with Egypt's relations with Sudan.

Later life
Returning to Sri Lanka after his work in the UN, he served as the chairman of the Telecom Board for three years. He was also served as a Peace Fellow at the United States Institute of Peace in Washington and was the funding Director-General of the Bandaranaike International Diplomatic Training Institute in Colombo.

Honours
 Awarded the title of Deshamanya by the Sri Lankan Government

References

Further reading
A Diplomat for All Seasons: essays in honour of Deshamanya Vernon L.B. Mendis; editor, Lorna Dewaraja. Colombo: Godage International Publishers,  2004 ISBN 9552075904

External links
Doyen of Diplomacy celebrates his birthday and fifty years of service to the nation, by Thilaka Perera
Vernon LB Mendis Diplomat par excellence
South Asian Foreign Relations' buddy icon Sri Lankan Foreign Service (SLFS) Career Diplomat from 1949
Sinhalayo by Senerat Paranavitana
We have a people-centric Foreign Policy – Foreign Minister 
LMD Writers
The Professional Diplomat, Deshamanya Vernon Mendis Down Memory Lane By Roshan Peiris

1925 births
2010 deaths
Ambassadors of Sri Lanka to Cuba
High Commissioners of Sri Lanka to the United Kingdom
High Commissioners of Sri Lanka to Canada
Ambassadors of Sri Lanka to France
Sri Lankan officials of the United Nations
UNESCO officials
Sinhalese civil servants
Sri Lankan diplomats
Sri Lankan Christians
Alumni of Royal College, Colombo
Alumni of the University of Ceylon (Colombo)
Alumni of SOAS University of London
Deshamanya